Zaïr Kédadouche (born 9 August 1957) is a French former professional footballer who played as a defender or a midfielder. He is also a published author with his 1996 book Zair le gaulois, and is the founder of the Cité nationale de l'histoire de l'immigration museum.

From 2008 to 2014, he became a French diplomat (Consul General in Liège, then ambassador in Andorra).

Honours
Orders
Chevalier of the Légion d'honneur: 2002

References

External links
 
 ZAIR KEDADOUCHE*, UN « BEUR-GEOIS » A L’ELYSEE
 De nouveaux talents

1957 births
Living people
Sportspeople from Tourcoing
Association football defenders
Association football midfielders
French sportspeople of Algerian descent
French people of Kabyle descent
French footballers
Kabyle people
CS Sedan Ardennes players
Paris FC players
Red Star F.C. players
Ligue 1 players
Ligue 2 players
Ambassadors of France to Andorra
French male writers
Chevaliers of the Légion d'honneur
Footballers from Hauts-de-France
21st-century French diplomats